Mannah is a surname of Arabic origin, which means "giver". It may refer to:

Jon Mannah (1989–2013), Australian rugby league player
Martyns Mannah (born 1975), Nigerian politician
Tim Mannah (born 1988), Australian rugby league player

See also
Manna (disambiguation)

Arabic-language surnames